Miika Antti-Roiko (born 20 November 1988 in Kalajoki, Finland) is a Finnish weightlifter. He competed for Finland at the 2012 Summer Olympics, finishing 19th on Men's 94 kg.

References

1988 births
Living people
Finnish male weightlifters
Weightlifters at the 2012 Summer Olympics
Olympic weightlifters of Finland
People from Kalajoki
Sportspeople from North Ostrobothnia
20th-century Finnish people
21st-century Finnish people